Michael Tyner Alsbury (March 19, 1975 – October 31, 2014) was an American test pilot for Scaled Composites. He died on October 31, 2014, during test flight PF04 of the Virgin Galactic SpaceShipTwo VSS Enterprise.

Personal life
Alsbury had been a flying enthusiast since childhood. He graduated from California Polytechnic State University with a Bachelor of Science degree in Aeronautical Engineering. Alsbury had been married to Michelle Saling for 12 years and had two children, aged 7 and 10, at the time of his death.

Career
Alsbury joined Scaled Composites in 2001 and began working as a project engineer and pilot. In April 2013, he served as copilot to Mark Stucky on the first powered flight for VSS Enterprise and SpaceShipTwo.

At the time of his death, he had 1800 flight hours, 1600 of them as a test pilot and engineer with Scaled Composites. 

In 2013, he received the Ray E. Tenhoff Award for the most outstanding technical paper at the Society of Experimental Test Pilots symposium along with Mark Stucky and Clint Nichols.

On October 31, 2014, Alsbury was test flying the Virgin Galactic SpaceShipTwo, VSS Enterprise with Peter Siebold. The craft broke up in-flight, resulting in a total loss of VSS Enterprise, which crashed in the California Mojave Desert. Alsbury was unable to exit the spacecraft, and his remains were found still strapped to his seat in the fuselage.  The pilot, Peter Siebold, survived. It was the ninth time that Alsbury had flown aboard the aircraft.

Legacy

On November 4, 2014, episode 5 of BBC One's Human Universe, presented by Brian Cox, was dedicated to Alsbury, as it had a sequence on Virgin Galactic test pilot David Mackay.

His name was added to the Space Mirror Memorial in 2020.

See also 
 VSS Enterprise crash

References

1975 births
2014 deaths
Accidental deaths in California
American test pilots
Aviators killed in aviation accidents or incidents in the United States
California Polytechnic State University alumni
Commercial astronauts
Scaled Composites
Space program fatalities
Victims of aviation accidents or incidents in 2014
Virgin Galactic